Oliver Shannon (born 12 September 1995) is an English footballer who plays as a midfielder for Bala Town in the Cymru Premier.

College career
Shannon was a four-year starter at Clemson University, serving as co-captain for his final two years. He contributed 13 goals and 17 assists in 82 appearances, 74 of which he started.

Professional career
Oliver Shannon was signed by Atlanta United on 21 February 2018. He made his debut for the second team on 24 March in a 3–1 win over New York Red Bulls II. He finished the season with 27 appearances and one goal for Atlanta United 2.

Shannon was released by Atlanta at the end of their 2018 season.

On 9 January 2020, Shannon joined Cymru Premier side Bala Town.

References

External links

1995 births
Living people
Association football midfielders
English footballers
Clemson Tigers men's soccer players
Atlanta United FC players
Atlanta United 2 players
Bala Town F.C. players
English expatriate footballers
Expatriate soccer players in the United States
Atlanta United FC draft picks
USL Championship players
Cymru Premier players
English expatriate sportspeople in the United States